The Man with Two Brains is a 1983 American science fiction black comedy film directed by Carl Reiner and starring Steve Martin and Kathleen Turner.

Written by Martin, Reiner and George Gipe and shot in summer 1982 at Laird International Studios in Culver City, California, the film is a broad comedy, with Martin starring as Dr. Michael Hfuhruhurr, a pioneering neurosurgeon with a cruel and unfaithful new wife, Dolores Benedict (Turner).

Plot 
Dr. Michael Hfuhruhurr, a widowed brain surgeon, is renowned for inventing a method of "cranial screw-top" brain surgery. He saves the life of Dolores Benedict, a gold-digging femme fatale who is accidentally run over by Michael when fleeing the scene of her latest husband's fatal coronary, caused by her malicious mind-games and scheming. As she recovers, Michael falls in love and they marry. Dolores torments Michael by pretending to be too ill to consummate the marriage, citing a continuing headache. On a honeymoon and business trip to a medical conference in Vienna, a city living in fear of the serial "Elevator Killer", Hfuhruhurr meets mad scientist Dr. Alfred Necessiter, who has created a technique enabling him to store living brains in liquid-filled jars using the Elevator Killer's victims.

Michael discovers he can communicate telepathically with one of Necessiter's brains, that of Anne Uumellmahaye, when they both sing Under the Bamboo Tree.  Michael and Anne fall in love, with Michael taking her brain away to spend more time with her. Dolores — having learned that Michael has received a large inheritance from his step-grandmother — attempts to reignite their relationship, but catches on to his relationship with Anne when she spots him in a rowboat with the jar. She attempts to kill Anne by putting her brain in an oven, causing Michael to literally toss Dolores out of his house.

Michael consults with Necessiter, who informs him that brains in tanks do not survive long, with Anne being his longest-living one to date. Necessiter recommends transplanting Anne's brain into a body of a recently-deceased woman, revealing that he has perfected a process that could allow him to do so. Filling a syringe with window cleaner, the substance used by the Elevator Killer, Michael sees a crowd gathering around an attractive woman hit by a car, and is seen as odd for hoping she will expire, only to see her regain consciousness. Michael next selects Fran - a prostitute with an annoying voice - but his conscience prevents him from killing her. Stepping into an elevator, he finds that Dolores has just been murdered by the Elevator Killer, who turns out to be Merv Griffin. Michael takes Dolores' corpse, and Griffin promises to turn himself in to the police.

Michael hurriedly takes Dolores's body to Necessiter's lab. He is stopped by the Austrian police, who suspect him of drunk driving. After a series of unusual sobriety tests, the police permit him to leave. However, as Dolores' body flails, the police realize that she was not drunk, but dead, and pursue his car. Michael makes it to the lab, where Necessiter transfers Anne's consciousness to Dolores's body, which is viewed by the stunned policemen. In the process, Michael is electrically shocked by the equipment and falls into a coma.

Waking up six weeks later, Michael meets Anne in Dolores's body. Anne is a compulsive eater, and has gained considerable weight in her new body. Michael loves Anne for who she is, and they get married. A note in the credits requests that the audience report the whereabouts of Merv Griffin if they see him.

Cast

Filming
Kathleen Turner said she used a body double for a sex scene in this movie.

Reception 
On Rotten Tomatoes the film has an approval rating of 78% based on reviews from 23 critics. The site's consensus states "As spastically uneven as its zany title suggests, The Man with Two Brains isn't peak Steve Martin -- but it's still often close enough to enjoy." On Metacritic the film has a score of 61 out of 100 based on 9 critic reviews, indicating "generally favorable reviews".

Roger Ebert gave the film 2 out of 4 stars, and wrote that despite the fact that he "never found Steve Martin irresistibly funny"  ... "it's a tribute to "The Man With Two Brains" that I found myself laughing a fair amount of the time, despite my feelings about Martin."

References

External links 

 
 
 

1983 films
1980s science fiction comedy films
1980s comedy horror films
1980s parody films
American science fiction comedy films
American comedy horror films
American parody films
1980s English-language films
Films directed by Carl Reiner
Films scored by Joel Goldsmith
Films with screenplays by Steve Martin
Mad scientist films
Warner Bros. films
Films set in Vienna
Films about brain transplants
Films with screenplays by Carl Reiner
1983 comedy films
1980s American films